Bosaso is a Administrative divisions of Somalia in the northeastern Bari region of Somalia. Its capital lies at Bosaso. It is also the commercial capital of Puntland state of Somalia and one of Somalia's commercial capitals, The city appreciates its indigenous clan who warmly welcomed all people reached there last 25 years, Ugaas Hassan Ugaas Yaasin is the well known traditional elder of the city]]. It has an estimated population of around 2,164,906 residents (2021 est.).

References

External links
 Districts of Somalia
 Administrative map of Bosaso District

Districts of Somalia

Bari, Somalia